Welwyn is a special service area in the Rural Municipality of Moosomin No. 121, Saskatchewan, Canada that held village status prior to May 2018. It is located in the southeastern portion of Saskatchewan, near the Manitoba border. The community was named for Welwyn, in Hertfordshire, England at the suggestion of James Wake, who homesteaded just across the Manitoba border. In 2016, the population was 133.

History 
Welwyn incorporated as a village on June 11, 1907. It restructured on May 1, 2018, relinquishing its village status in favour of becoming a special service area under the jurisdiction of the Rural Municipality of Moosomin No. 121.

Demographics 
In the 2016 Census of Population conducted by Statistics Canada, Welwyn recorded a population of 133 living in 61 of its 61 total private dwellings, a  change from its 2011 population of 135.

See also 
List of communities in Saskatchewan
List of special service areas in Saskatchewan

References 

Moosomin No. 121, Saskatchewan
Special service areas in Saskatchewan
Former villages in Saskatchewan
Populated places disestablished in 2018
Division No. 5, Saskatchewan